Only five people have been executed by the state of Washington since the death penalty statute was reformed following the 1976 Supreme Court decisions. Capital punishment was declared unconstitutional by the Washington Supreme Court in 2018.

See also 
 Capital punishment in Washington (state)
 Capital punishment in the United States

Notes 

Washington
People executed by Washington (state)